Baythorne End is a hamlet in the English county of Essex, England. It is located directly on the border with Suffolk. The hamlet is within the civil parish of Birdbrook and forms a part of the Braintree parliamentary seat.
Immediate neighbouring villages include: Ridgewell, Sturmer, Stoke-by-Clare and Wixoe.

Notable buildings include Baythorne Mill, Baythorne Hall, which dates from 1341  and the mansion and estate at Baythorne Park. 

The estate was purchased by George Pyke in 1640, where he built the Baythorne Park mansion some 28 years later. The mansion was somewhat larger than Baythorne Hall. Baythorne Park continued to be owned by the Pyke family for well over 200 years.

References

External links 

Hamlets in Essex
Braintree District